Bowersville may refer to three places in the United States:

Bowersville, Georgia
Bowersville, Ohio
Bowersville, Pennsylvania
Bowersville, Virginia